The FIA WTCC Race of Turkey was a round of the World Touring Car Championship, which was held at the Istanbul Park circuit near Istanbul in Turkey.

The race was run in the first season of the WTCC after its return in 2005. It remained on the calendar for 2006, but was dropped in 2007 in favour of the Race of Sweden. The race was won by three different Italian drivers during its two years.

Winners

References

Turkey
Race of Turkey